Grand-Fort-Philippe is a commune in the Nord department in northern France.

History
The commune of Grand-Fort-Philippe was created in 1884, but the town had existed for a long time before that.

Heraldry

Demography
At the creation of the commune, in 1884, the population was of 2,641 inhabitants. In 1990, they were 6,477 inhabitants, and in 2006, 5,582.

See also
Communes of the Nord department

References

Grandfortphilippe
French Flanders